Abdul-Karim Farhan (born 26 November 1956) is a former Iraqi footballer  who played for Iraq in the 1978 Asian Games. He played for the national team between 1976 and 1979.  and is currently assistant coach of the Olympic team.

References

1956 births
Iraqi footballers
Iraq international footballers
Footballers at the 1978 Asian Games
Living people
Asian Games competitors for Iraq
Association football defenders